A placental site nodule (PSN) is benign remnant from a previous pregnancy.

Presentation
They are typically asymptomatic and found incidentally.

Pathology
PSNs are intermediate trophoblastic remnants.

Diagnosis
PSNs are diagnosed by examining the tissue under a microscope, usually obtained with a dilation and curettage.

Typically, they consist of pink (hyaline) material using the standard stain and contain few cells.  Bizarre multinucleated cells may be present; however, there is no mitotic activity.  The differential diagnosis includes (cervical) squamous cell carcinoma, gestational trophoblastic disease, and exaggerated placental site.

Prognosis
PSN are benign. Once removed, they do not require any treatment and do not recur.

See also
Gestational trophoblastic disease
Placental site trophoblastic tumour

References

External links 

Health issues in pregnancy